Roberto Frassinelli (1811–1887) was a German archaeologist, naturalist, bibliophile, and draftsman.

Biography

References 

1811 births
1887 deaths
German artists
Archaeologists from Baden-Württemberg